Alpine Peak may refer to:

 A peak in the Alps
 Alpine Peak (Idaho)